Sandra Colleen Waites (15 December 1948 – 28 December 1991), known professionally as Cassandra Harris, was an Australian actress.

Early life 
Born in Sydney, Harris was a student at the National Institute of Dramatic Art. She enrolled in 1961, aged 12, under the name Sandra Gleeson. She went on to perform in the Sydney stage production of Boeing Boeing (1964–1965).

Harris appeared in The Greek Tycoon (1978), Rough Cut (1980), and the James Bond film For Your Eyes Only (1981) as the Countess Lisl von Schlaf, the ill-fated mistress of Milos Colombo (played by Israeli actor Topol). While filming this movie, her third husband, Pierce Brosnan, met producer Albert R. Broccoli, which eventually led to his casting as James Bond in four films. She guest-starred in several episodes of the television series Remington Steele with Brosnan; they married on 27 December 1980.

Personal life and death 
Harris had three children: Charlotte Harris (1971–2013) and Christopher (born 1972) by Dermot Harris, brother of actor Richard Harris, and son Sean Brosnan (born 1983), by Pierce Brosnan, who adopted Charlotte and Christopher after their father died in 1986.

In 1987, Harris was diagnosed with ovarian cancer, the same disease that had claimed her own mother's life. She battled the illness for four years until her death on 28 December 1991, 13 days after her 43rd birthday. Her daughter Charlotte also died from ovarian cancer on 28 June 2013, aged 42.

Filmography

Television

References

External links 

Cassandra Harris (Aveleyman)

 

1948 births
1991 deaths
Actresses from Sydney
Australian film actresses
Deaths from ovarian cancer
Deaths from cancer in California
20th-century Australian actresses